Variimorda ishiharai is a species of "tumbling flower beetles" in the subfamily Mordellinae of the family Mordellidae. It is endemic to Taiwan.

References

External links
 Biolib

Mordellidae
Beetles of Asia
Insects of Taiwan
Endemic fauna of Taiwan
Beetles described in 1994